The  Kuhljochspitze is a mountain,  high, in the Erlspitze Group in the Karwendel Alps in Austria.

Ascent 
The normal route runs from the Solsteinhaus along the Freiungen Ridgeway (Freiungen-Höhenweg) to the col of Kuhljochscharte; from there the summit is attainable in 30 minutes of easy climbing.

Literature 
 Walter Klier: Alpenvereinsführer Karwendel alpin, 15th edn., 2005, Bergverlag Rudolf  Rother, Munich,

External links 
  Tour description

Two-thousanders of Austria
Mountains of Tyrol (state)
Mountains of the Alps
Karwendel